Eduardo Quiñones (born April 28, 1983 in San Felipe, Chile) is a Chilean footballer currently playing for Curicó Unido of the Primera B Chilena.

Teams
  Unión San Felipe 2003-2010
  Curicó Unido 2011–present

Titles
  Unión San Felipe 2009 (Torneo Apertura Primera B Championship) and 8Chilean Primera B Championship)

References
 
 

1983 births
Living people
Chilean footballers
Primera B de Chile players
Chilean Primera División players
Curicó Unido footballers
Unión San Felipe footballers
Association football defenders
People from San Felipe, Chile